Terrassola is a locality located in the municipality of Lladurs, in Province of Lleida province, Catalonia, Spain. As of 2020, it has a population of 21.

Geography 
Terrassola is located 123km northeast of Lleida.

References

Populated places in the Province of Lleida